Intuition (Spanish: La corazonada) is a 2020 Argentine crime-thriller film written and directed by Alejandro Montiel and starring Luisana Lopilato and Joaquín Furriel. Based on the novel La Vírgen en tus Ojos (Spanish: The Virgin in your Eyes) by Florencia Etcheves, the film serves as a prequel to the 2018 film Perdida. It is Netflix's first Argentine original movie.

Cast
 Luisana Lopilato as Manuela Pelari
 Joaquín Furriel as Francisco Juanéz
 Rafael Ferro as Fiscal Emilio Roger
 Delfina Chaves as Gloriana Márquez
 Maite Lanata as Minerva del Valle 
 Juan Manuel Guilera as Fito Lagos
 Marita Ballesteros as Inés Quesada
 Sebastián Mogordoy as Suboficial Ordoñez
 Abel Ayala as El Zorro

Release
It was released on May 28, 2020.

References

External links
 
 

2020 films
2020 crime thriller films
Argentine crime thriller films
Argentine mystery films
Films based on Argentine novels
Films based on crime novels
Films set in Argentina
Prequel films
Spanish-language Netflix original films
Spanish crime drama films
Spanish mystery films
Spanish thriller drama films
Argentine prequel films
2020s Argentine films